Small talk is an informal type of discourse that does not cover any functional topics of conversation or any transactions that need to be addressed. In essence, it is polite and standard conversation about unimportant things.

The phenomenon of small talk was initially studied in 1923 by Bronisław Malinowski in his essay "The Problem of Meaning in Primitive Languages", who coined the term "phatic communication" to describe it. The ability to conduct small talk is a social skill.

Purpose 
In spite of seeming to have little useful purpose, small talk is a bonding ritual and a strategy for managing interpersonal distance. It serves many functions in helping to define the relationships between friends, colleagues, and new acquaintances. In particular, it helps new acquaintances to explore and categorize each other's social position.

Small talk is closely related to the need for people to maintain a positive face and feel approved of by those who are listening to them. It lubricates social interactions in a very flexible way, but the desired function is often dependent on the point in the conversation at which the small talk occurs:

 Conversation opener: when the speakers do not know each other, it allows them to show that they have friendly intentions and desire some sort of positive interaction. In a business meeting, it enables people to establish each other's reputation and level of expertise. If there is already a relationship between the two talkers, their small talk serves as a gentle introduction before engaging in more functional topics of conversation. It allows them to signal their own mood and to sense the mood of the other person.
 At the end of a conversation: suddenly ending an exchange may risk appearing to reject the other person. Small talk can be used to mitigate that rejection, affirm the relationship between the two people, and soften the parting.
 Space filler to avoid silence: in many cultures, silences between two people are usually considered uncomfortable and/or awkward. Tension can be reduced by starting phatic talk until a more substantial subject arises. Generally, humans find prolonged silence uncomfortable, and sometimes unbearable. That can be due to human evolutionary history as a social species, as in many other social animals, silence is a communicative sign of potential danger.

In some conversations, there is no specific functional or informative element at all. The following example of small talk is between two colleagues who pass each other in a hallway:
 William: Morning, Paul.
 Paul: Oh, morning, William, how are you doing?
 William: Fine, thanks. Have a good weekend.
 Paul: Yes, thanks. Catch you later.
 William: OK, see you.

In that example, the elements of phatic talk at the beginning and end of the conversation have merged. The entire short conversation is a space-filler. This type of discourse is often called chatter.

The need to use small talk depends upon the nature of the relationship between the people having the conversation. Couples in an intimate relationship can signal their level of closeness by a lack of small talk. They can comfortably accept silence in circumstances that would be uncomfortable for two people who were only casual friends.

In workplace situations, small talk tends to occur mostly between workers on the same level, but it can be used by managers as a way of developing the working relationships with the staff who report to them. Bosses who ask their employees to work overtime may try to motivate them by using small talk to temporarily decrease their difference in status.

The balance between functional conversation and small talk in the workplace depends on the context and is also influenced by the relative power of the two speakers. It is usually the superior who defines the conversation because they have the power to close the small talk and "get down to business."

Topics 
The topics of small talk conversations are generally less important than their social function.  The selected topic usually depends on any pre-existing relationship between the two people, and the circumstances of the conversation.  In either case, someone initiating small talk will tend to choose a topic for which they can assume a shared background knowledge, to prevent the conversation from being too one-sided.

Topics can be summarised as being either direct or indirect.  Direct topics include personal observations such as health or looks. Indirect topics refer to a situational context such as the latest news, or the conditions of the communicative situation. Some topics are considered to be "safe" in most circumstances, such as the weather, sports, and television. Asking about the weather when the weather lacks reason for a follow-up discussion may stall a conversation.

Typically the level of detail offered avoids overstepping the bounds of interpersonal space.  When asked "How are you?" by an acquaintance they do not know well, a person is likely to choose a simple, generalized reply such as "I am good, thank you." In this circumstance, it would usually not be appropriate for them to reply with a list of symptoms of any medical conditions they were suffering from. To do so would assume a greater degree of familiarity between the two people than is actually the case, and this may create an uncomfortable situation.

Conversational patterns 
A study of small talk in situations that involve the chance meeting of strangers has been carried out by Klaus Schneider. He theorizes that such a conversation consists of a number of fairly predictable segments, or "moves". The first move is usually phrased so that it is easy for the other person to agree. It may be either a question or a statement of opinion with a tag question. For example, an opening line such as "Lovely weather, isn't it?" is a clear invitation for agreement. The second move is the other person's response. In functional conversations that address a particular topic, Grice's maxim of quantity suggests that responses should contain no more information than was explicitly asked for. Schneider claims that one of the principles of small talk contradicts the maxim of quantity. He suggests that politeness in small talk is maximised by responding with a more substantial answer. Going back to the example of "Lovely weather, isn't it?", to respond factually by just saying "Yes" (or even "No") is less polite than saying, "Yes, very mild for the time of year". Schneider describes that subsequent moves may involve an acknowledgement such as "I see", a positive evaluation such as "That's nice", or what's called "idling behaviour", such as "Mmm", or "Really?".

Gender differences 
Speech patterns between women tend to be more collaborative than those of men, and tend to support each other's involvement in the conversation. Topics for small talk are more likely to include compliments about some aspect of personal appearance. For example, "That dress really suits you."  Small talk between women who are friends may also involve a greater degree of self disclosure. Topics may cover more personal aspects of their lives, their troubles, and their secrets. This self-disclosure both generates a closer relationship between them and is also a signal of that closeness.

By contrast, men's small talk tends to be more competitive. It may feature verbal sparring matches, playful insults, and putdowns. However, in a way these are also both creators and signals of solidarity; the men are signalling that they are comfortable enough with each other's company to be able to say these things without them being taken as insults.

Cultural differences 
Small talk varies country to country and people to people. Southern Europeans, for example, are said to be very good at using lots of words to convey very little information.

Also, small talk rules and topics can differ widely between cultures. Weather is a common topic in regions where the climate has great variation and can be unpredictable. Questions about the family are usual in some Asian and Arab countries. In cultures or contexts that are status-oriented, such as China, Latin America and Japan, small talk between new acquaintances may feature exchange of questions that enable social categorization of each other.

Differences among members of various cultural groups in aspects of their attitudes to small talk and ways of dealing with small talk situations are considered to be rooted in their socioculturally ingrained perception of interpersonal relationships. In many European cultures it is common to discuss the weather, politics or the economy, although in some countries personal finance issues such as salary are considered taboo.

Finland and Sweden have been cited as countries where there is little culture of small talk and people are more comfortable with silence.

See also 
 Active listening
 Cheap talk (game theory)
 Contact call
 Sociolinguistics
 Transactional analysis
 Phatic expression
 Tritsch-Tratsch-Polka by Johann Strauss II, from the German for "chit-chat"

References

External links 

Bibliography by Anne Barron and Klaus-Peter Schneider
Spanish Small Talk: A Beginners' Guide

Oral communication